Ecsenius ops, known commonly as the eye-spot blenny or the yellow-eye combtooth-blenny in Indonesia, is a species of combtooth blenny the family Blenniidae.

It is found in the central Indo-Pacific area, specifically around Indonesia.

It can reach a maximum length of 5.5 centimetres.

Blennies in this species feed primarily off of plants, including benthic algae and weeds.

References

External links
http://www.marinespecies.org/aphia.php?p=taxdetails&id=277672
 Springer, V. G.  and G. R. Allen  2001. Ecsenius ops, from Indonesia, and E. tricolor from western Philippines and northwestern Kalimantan, new species of blenniid fishes in the stigmatura species group. Aqua, Journal of Ichthyology and Aquatic Biology v. 4 (no. 4): 151–160.

ops
Fish described in 2001
Taxa named by Victor G. Springer
Taxa named by Gerald R. Allen